Nikolas Korzeniecki (born 26 September 2001) is a Canadian professional soccer player who plays as a midfielder for Polish club Warta Poznań.

Career
Korzeniecki joined the youth academy of Canadian side Port Moody Soccer Club. In 2018, he moved to the youth academy of Śląsk Wrocław.

In 2019, he signed for Polish fifth division club Chrobry Głogów II.

In 2020, Korzeniecki signed for Zagłębie Sosnowiec in the Polish second division.

In July 2022, he joined Ekstraklasa side Radomiak Radom.

On 25 January 2023, having mostly played for Radomiak's reserve side and making one cup appearance for the senior squad, he left to join another top flight side Warta Poznań on a six-month contract.

References

External links
 
 

Living people
2001 births
Soccer players from Vancouver
Canadian people of Polish descent
Canadian soccer players
Association football midfielders
I liga players
Zagłębie Sosnowiec players
Radomiak Radom players
Warta Poznań players
Canadian expatriate soccer players
Expatriate footballers in Poland
Canadian expatriate sportspeople in Poland
21st-century Canadian people